Wieringermeer is a former municipality and a polder in the Netherlands, in the province of North Holland. Since 2012 Wieringermeer has been a part of the new municipality of Hollands Kroon.

Population centres 

The former municipality of Wieringermeer consisted of the following cities, towns, villages and/or districts: Kreileroord, Middenmeer, Slootdorp, Wieringerwerf.

History 
Around the year 1000 AD, this area was land. However, several storms after 1100 flooded the land, turning it into a flood plain. Wieringmeer means "Wieringen Lake", the name of an inland lake that filled the area in the early medieval period.

The Wieringmeerpolder is a polder, newly created land, and part of the Zuiderzee Works developed in the 20th century. The creation of this polder started in 1927. Originally the polder was planned to have been created after the completion of the Afsluitdijk. As there was a severe lack of agricultural ground, the dikes for the polder had to be built in the Zuiderzee, a sea. The dikes had to be tougher and ready to withstand the force of the sea. Draining of the polder was finished on 21 August 1930. After the completion of the Afsluitdijk in 1932, the lake IJsselmeer was formed from the waters. 

After desalinization, the new land became usable in 1934. Four villages (Slootdorp (1931), Middenmeer (1933), Wieringerwerf (1936) and Kreileroord (1957)) eventually were developed in the polder.

Since 1 July 1941, the Wieringermeer had been an independent municipality. During the Second World War, the Netherlands was occupied by Nazi Germany. On 17 April 1945, a vengeful German command ordered the dike of the Wieringermeer to be blown up: the area was inundated. No one was killed as the polder slowly submerged again (the inhabitants had been warned), but the high water and a subsequent storm destroyed most of the infrastructure built in the previous decade. The floodwater was fresh water, so the land did not have to be desalinated again. Reconstruction followed quickly; by the end of 1945, the polder was declared drained again. Rebuilding of roads and bridges, houses and farms, was greatly facilitated by the experience of building them the first time.

Local government 
The former municipal council of Wieringermeer consisted of 15 seats, which were divided as follows:
 CDA – 4 seats
 VVD – 4 seats
 Gemeente Belangen Wieringermeer – 2 seats
 PvdA – 2 seats
 ChristianUnion – 1 seat
 Independent – 1 seat
 Progressief Wieringermeer – 1 seat

References 

 Statistics are taken from the SDU Staatscourant

Zuiderzee Works
Municipalities of the Netherlands disestablished in 2012
Former municipalities of North Holland
Polders of North Holland
Hollands Kroon